The Freightliner FS-65 is a cowled school bus chassis (conventional style) that was manufactured by Freightliner from 1997 to 2008.  Derived from the Freightliner FL-Series medium-duty trucks, the FS-65 was produced primarily for school bus applications, though commercial-use buses and cutaway-cab buses were also built using the FS-65 chassis.

While developed by Freightliner before its acquisition of the Ford heavy-truck product range at the end of 1996 (and medium-duty truck lines were not included as part of the sale) the FS-65 would go on to serve as an indirect successor of the long-running Ford B-Series chassis.  After 1998, Ford concentrated bus production towards van-derived chassis, leaving Freightliner to acquire much of the market share of full-size bus production owned by Ford.

The FS-65 chassis was assembled in Gaffney, South Carolina by the Freightliner Custom Chassis subsidiary of Freightliner; as an incomplete vehicle, the chassis was shipped to body manufacturers for final assembly of a bus.  After a total of 62,764 units were produced, the final Freightliner FS-65 chassis rolled off the assembly line in September 2006, owned by O'Brien Bus Service, Inc. based out of Maryland.

Model history

Following the 1991 introduction of the Business Class medium-duty trucks, Freightliner Trucks began development of a school bus chassis based upon the vehicle.  In May 1996, the first prototype (with a Thomas body) was unveiled.  The first completely new school bus chassis introduced since the 1980 redesign of the Ford B-Series, the Freightliner school bus chassis (later named the Freightliner FS-65) was scheduled for mid-1996 production; the first Freightliner bus rolled off the assembly line in January 1997.

The FS-65 distinguished itself from other school bus chassis by the standardization of hydraulic anti-lock brakes at the time of its introduction (two years before their requirement in 1998).  In tandem with the sloped hood, to aid driver visibility, the design of the chassis used a raised platform for the driver's seat.  Although the FS-65 was designed alongside Thomas Built Buses (a company which Freightliner acquired in 1998), the Freightliner chassis was made available to other body manufacturers.  As a result of the driver's platform, many bus bodies saw revisions to their designs to accommodate the FS-65 chassis, including windshield redesigns or the standardization of high-headroom bodies.

During its production run, the FS-65 chassis saw relatively few changes.  For 2002, the Mercedes-Benz MBE900 diesel engines were added to the powertrain line as an option.  For 2004, the Caterpillar 3126 became the Caterpillar C7 (as part of an emissions upgrade).  A redesign of the instrument panel adopted a new instrument cluster, shared with the M2 and Sterling trucks.

In 2001, Freightliner introduced the second-generation Business Class, the M2.  In 2004, the Thomas Saf-T-Liner C2 was introduced as the school bus variant of the M2.  Sold alongside the C2, the FS-65 remained in production into the 2007 model year; the final Thomas school bus based on the FS-65 was produced in November 2006.

The 2006 discontinuation of the FS-65 marked the end of the FL-Series (alongside its severe-service variants), as medium-duty production ended after 2004.

Body manufacturers
At its 1997 launch, the FS-65 was widely available to manufacturers throughout the industry with a notable exception.  AmTran never offered the chassis with its bus body (as the company was owned by Navistar International, one of the largest competitors of Freightliner).

Following the 2001 closure of Carpenter and the 2002 withdrawal of Corbeil from full-size bus production, Blue Bird ended the use of Freightliner chassis (in favor of a proprietary chassis, the Vision), leaving Freightliner subsidiary Thomas Built Buses the sole user of the FS-65 chassis for school bus production.

Powertrain 

The Freightliner FS-65 is notable as the first all-new school bus chassis in North America sold exclusively with diesel engines.  Initially available with Caterpillar and Cummins diesel engines (shared with the Saf-T-Liner transits), in 2002, the FS-65 introduced the Mercedes-Benz MBE 900 diesels as an option.

An Allison 2000 automatic transmission was the standard transmission sold with the FS-65, with the Allison MD3060 as an option.  A rarely-ordered option included a Fuller 5-speed manual transmission, making the FS-65 one of the last school buses sold with a manual transmission.

See also

 Freightliner Trucks - chassis manufacturer
 Thomas Built Buses - primary body manufacturer
 School Bus
 List of buses

References
Freightliner Custom Chassis: School Bus Specifications | FS-65 Spec Sheet -archived

External links 
 

School bus chassis
FS-65
Vehicles introduced in 1997